Sungai Limau is a small town in Yan District, Kedah, Malaysia. (There is also a Sungai Limau in Lunas, Kedah). It is the birthplace of the late Ibrahim Hussein, an eminent modern artist in Malaysia.

References 

Towns in Kedah
Yan District